"Matthew, Mark, Luke and John", also known as the "Black Paternoster", is an English children's bedtime prayer and nursery rhyme. It has a Roud Folk Song Index number of 1704. It may have origins in ancient Babylonian prayers and was being used in a Christian version in late Medieval Germany. The earliest extant version in English can be traced to the mid-sixteenth century. It was mentioned by English Protestant writers as a "popish" or magical charm. It is related to other prayers, including a "Green" and "White Paternoster", which can be traced to late Medieval England and with which it is often confused. It has been the inspiration for a number of literary works by figures including Henry Wadsworth Longfellow and musical works by figures such as Gustav Holst. It has been the subject of alternative versions and satires.

Lyrics

The most common modern version of the verse is as follows:

The Roud Folk Song Index, which catalogues folk songs and their variations by number, classifies the song as 1704.

Origins

The verse may be one of few English nursery rhymes to have ancient origins. The Babylonian prayer "Shamash before me, behind me Sin, Nergal at my right, Ninib at my left", is echoed by the medieval Jewish prayer: "In the name of the Lord, the God of Israel, may Michael be at my right hand; Gabriel at my left; Uriel before me; Raphael behind me and the Shekhinah of God be above my head" which is used as a prayer before sleep. A Christian version has been found for Germany at the end of the Medieval period. However, the first known record of the lyrics in English is from Thomas Ady's witchcraft treatise A Candle in the Dark, or, a treatise concerning the nature of witches and witchcraft (1656), which tells of a woman in Essex who claimed to have lived in the reign of Mary I (r. 1553-8) and who was alive in his time and blessed herself every night with the "popish charm":

George Sinclair, writing of Scotland in his Satan's Invisible World Discovered in 1685, repeated Ady's story and told of a witch who used a "Black Paternoster", at night, which seems very similar to Ady's rhyme:

A year later it was quoted again by John Aubrey, but in the form:

A version similar to that quoted at the beginning of this article was first recorded by Sabine Baring-Gould in 1891, and it survived as a popular children's prayer in England into the twentieth century.

"White Paternoster"

Robert Grosseteste  (c. 1175–1253), Bishop of Lincoln, condemned the use of a "Green Paternoster" by old women in a treatise on blasphemy, which contained reference to "Green Pater Noster, Peter's dear sister". In Chaucer's "Miller's Tale" (c. 1387) he refers to a prayer known as the "White Paternoster", elements of which, particularly the blessing of four parts of a house, can be seen in the later "Black Paternoster":

The reference to St. Peter's sister may be a substitution for St. Peter's supposed daughter, St. Petronilla, known in England as St. Parnell. It has been suggested that the differing colours associated with these verses may have been determined by the colour of prayer beads, with different coloured beads used to prompt the recitation of aves and paternosters.

After the Reformation this "White Paternoster" was among a number of prayers and devotions that were converted into magical rhymes, becoming widely known charms. Lancashire minister John White (1570–1615) in his The Way to the True Church (1608) recorded among many "superstitions" of the inhabitants of Lancashire, a "White Paternoster":

Sinclair in 1685 contrasted the "Black Paternoster" to be used at night with a "White Paternoster" to be used in the day.

Anthropologist Margaret Murray suggested in her controversial 1933 book The God of the Witches that the names of the two companion verses could be interpreted as "a confused version of a Christian prayer or hymn":

Literary and musical references
John Rutter set the lyrics of the nursery rhyme for choir a cappella in the collection Five Childhood Lyrics, first performed in 1973. 

The "White Paternoster" was used by Henry Wadsworth Longfellow (1807–82) as a mockery of the mass by Lucifer, described as the "Black Paternoster"  in his narrative poem The Golden Legend (1851). It was also the title of a short story by Theodore Francis Powys (1875–1953) published in 1930. A four-part choir setting of the Black Paternoster text was produced by Gustav Holst (1874–1934) in early 20th-Century Britain, while contemporary countryman Henry Walford Davies (1869–1941) composed an equivalent setting of the White Paternoster.

Satires
The rhyme has often been the source of satire. One of the most common was recorded in Scotland in the 1840s as a hobby horse game among boys, with the lyrics:

A version from the United States recorded in 1900 began:

See also
Saint Patrick's Breastplate

Notes

Citations

Christian prayer
English nursery rhymes
English folk songs
English children's songs
Traditional children's songs
Songwriter unknown
Year of song unknown